The Ukraine men's national under-20 basketball team is a national basketball team of Ukraine, administered by the Basketball Federation of Ukraine. It represents the country in international men's under-20 basketball competitions.

FIBA U20 European Championship participations

See also
Ukraine men's national basketball team
Ukraine men's national under-18 basketball team
Ukraine women's national under-20 basketball team

References

External links
Archived records of Ukraine team participations

Basketball in Ukraine
under-20
Men's national under-20 basketball teams